A fleece jacket (or simply a fleece) is a lightweight casual jacket made of a polyester synthetic wool such as polar fleece.

A fleece jacket will typically have a zipper up the middle, rather than buttons or other fasteners.  It will provide thermal insulation but is not normally weatherproof and so it will not effectively keep out wind and rain.

History
Polar fleece originated in Massachusetts in 1979 when Malden Mills, (now Polartec LLC), and Patagonia developed Synchilla (synthetic chinchilla). It was a new, light, strong pile fabric meant to mimic—and in some ways surpass—wool. Company CEO Aaron Feuerstein intentionally declined to patent Polar fleece, allowing the material to be produced cheaply and widely by many vendors, leading to the material's quick and wide acceptance.

References

Jackets